Aimé is a French masculine given name. The feminine form is Aimée, translated as "beloved".

Aimé may refer to:

Given name 

 Saint Amatus or Saint Aimé (died 690), Benedictine monk, saint, abbot and bishop in Switzerland
 Aimé, duc de Clermont-Tonnerre (1779–1865), French general, Minister of the Navy and the Colonies and Minister of War
 Aimé Adam (1913–2009), Canadian politician
 Aimé Anthuenis (born 1943), Belgian former football coach and player
 Aimé Barelli (1917–1995), French jazz trumpeter, vocalist and bandleader
 Aimé Barraud (1902–1954), Swiss painter
 Aimé Bazin (1904–1984), French art director
 Aimé Majorique Beauparlant (1864–1911), Canadian politician
 Aimé Bénard (1873–1938), Canadian politician
 Aimé Bergeal (1912–1973), French politician
 Aimé Boji, Congolese politician, member of the National Assembly since 2006
 Aimé Bonpland (1773–1858), French explorer and botanist
 Aimé Boucher (1877–1946), Canadian politician
 Aimé Brun (1887–1969), French philatelist
 Aimé Picquet du Boisguy (1776–1839), French Royalist general during the French Revolution
 Aimé Cassayet-Armagnac (1893–1927), French rugby union player
 Aimé Césaire (1913–2008), French poet, author and politician
 Aimé Clariond (1894–1959), French stage and film actor
 Aimé Cotton (1869–1951), French physicist
 Aimé De Gendt (born 1994), Belgian racing cyclist
 Aimé Deolet (1906–1986), Belgian racing cyclist
 Aimé Desprez (1783–1824), French vaudeville playwright and chansonnier
 Aimé Dossche (1902–1985), Belgian racing cyclist
 Aimé Dupont (1842–1900), Belgian-born American sculptor and photographer
 Aimé Duval or Père Duval, (1918–1984), French Jesuit priest, singer-songwriter and guitarist
 Aime Forand (1895–1972), American politician
 Aimé Fritz (1884–1950), American cyclist
 Aimé Thomé de Gamond (1807–1876), French engineer who devoted his life to championing a tunnel between France and England
 Amédée (Aimé) Gibaud (1885–1957), French chess master
 Aimé Girard (1831–1898), French chemist, agronomist and professor
 Aimé Gruet-Masson (1940–2014), French biathlete
 Aimé Guertin (1898–1970), Canadian business owner and politician
 Aimé Haegeman (1861–1935), Belgian equestrian
 Aimé Halbeher (1936–2021), French political activist and syndicalist
 Aimé Humbert (1819–1900), Swiss politician
 Aimé Charles Irvoy (1824–1898), French sculptor
 Aimé Jacquet (born 1941), French retired football coach and player
 Aime Kitenge (born 1975), Burundian retired football goalkeeper
 Aimé Koudou (born 1976), Ivorian former footballer
 Aimé Langlois (1880–1954), Canadian politician
 Aimé Leborne (1797–1866), Belgium-born French composer and music educator
 Aimé Laussedat (1819–1907), French scientist
 Aimé Lavie (born 1984), French footballer
 Aimé Lepercq (1889–1944), French soldier, member of the Resistance, industrialist and politician
 Aimé Mabika (born 1998), Zambian footballer
 Aimé Maeght (1906–1981), French art dealer, collector, lithographer and publisher
 Aimé Maillart (1817–1871), French composer best known for his operas
 Aimé Martin (1781–1844), French writer
 Aimé Leon Meyvis (1877–1932), Flemish landscape painter
 Aimé Michel (1919–1992), French ufologist
 Aimé Mignot (born 1932), French former football manager and player
 Aimé Millet (1819–1891), French sculptor
 Aimé Morot (1850–1913), French painter and sculptor
 Aimé Ngoy Mukena, Congolese politician, Minister of Petroleum and Gas since 2015 and former Minister of Defence and Veterans' Affairs (2014–2015)
 Aimé Nzohabonayo (born 1989), Burundian footballer
 Aimé Olivier de Sanderval (1840–1919), French explorer, entrepreneur and author
 Aimé Paris (1798–1866), French scholar and developer of a method of stenography
 Aimé Pelletier (1914–2010), Canadian surgeon and novelist under the pen name Bertrand Vac
 Aimé Perpillou (1902–1976), French geographer
 Aimé Proot (1890–1959), Belgian long-distance runner
 Aimé Rakotondrajaona, Malagasy politician
 Aimé Rosso (born 1955), French former footballer
 Aimé Simard (1968–2003), Canadian contract killer
 Aimé Simon-Girard (1889–1950), French film actor
 Aimé Terme (born 1945), French former weightlifter
 Aimé Teisseire (1914–2008), French officer who served in World War II and Indochina, a Grand Officier of the Légion d'Honneur
 Aimé Trantoul (1908–1986), French cyclist
 Aimé Félix Tschiffely (1895–1954), Swiss-born Argentine professor, writer and adventurer
 Aimé Venel (born 1950), French painter
 Aimé Vingtrinier (1812–1903), French printer, writer and amateur historian
 Aimé Emmanuel Yoka, Congolese politician

Surname 
 Boman Aimé (born 1989), Ivorian footballer
 Léon Aimé (1924–2021), French politician
 Valcour Aime (1798–1867), American sugar planter, philanthropist and pioneer in the large-scale refining of sugar

See also 
 Aime, an Estonian feminine given name
 Bien-Aimé (disambiguation), which includes a list of people with the surname
 Aimé Leon Dore, fashion and lifestyle brand

References

External link 

French masculine given names